Moomin is a comic strip created by Tove Jansson, and followed up by Lars Jansson, featuring their Moomin family of characters. The first comic strip, entitled  (Moomintroll and The End of The World) was a short-lived project for the children's section of the Finland-Swedish leftist newspaper Ny Tid. It was written between 1947 and 1948, at the request of the editor, a friend of Jansson's, Atos Wirtanen. The series was published with two new strips weekly, and was mainly an adaptation of Comet in Moominland. The series has been reprinted in book form under the name  (The World is Ending) by the newspaper.

The main series of Moomin comic strips were made directly for the British market: they were spread by the British Associated Newspapers comic strip syndicate and the original publisher was the Evening News newspaper. The series originally appeared in newspapers from 1954 to 1975. At its peak, Moomin appeared in over 40 countries and about 120 papers, with over 20 million readers daily, making it the most successful Finnish comic strip ever published. Tove and Lars Jansson received the Finnish Comic Strip Association's "Puupää-hattu" award in 1980.

In the 1990s, a comic book version of Moomin was produced in Scandinavia after Dennis Livson and Lars Jansson's Moomin animated series was shown on television. The Janssons had no involvement in these comic books. However, in the wake of the comic book's success, two new Moomin comic strips were launched under the artistic and content oversight of Lars and his daughter, Sophia Jansson-Zambra. Sophia now provides sole oversight for the strips. The original comic strip stories made by Tove Jansson and Lars Jansson has had adaptations including Moomin (1990) anime series and the 2014 animated film based on Moomin on the Riviera comic strip story.

History
The comic strip was born, when Charles Sutton, the leader of the Associated Newspapers syndicate contacted Tove Jansson. Jannson's first Moomin books Comet in Moominland (1946) and Finn Family Moomintroll (1948) had already been translated to English and had been successful in the United Kingdom. In a letter to Jansson in January 1952, Sutton asked if she was willing to transfer the Moomins to comic strip format:
It has come to my mind, that your "Moomin" family could make an interesting comic strip, which would not necessarily be aimed at children. It is obvious that the Moomin family appeals to children, but we think these wonderful creatures could be used in comic strip form to satirise our so-called civilised lifestyle.
At the time, Tove Jansson had already had experience in drawing Moomin comic strips. She had already published a long comic strip story Mumintrollet och jordens undergång in the Finland-Swedish Ny Tid newspaper in 1947, which was loosely based on her book Comet in Moominland. The comic strip attracted strong criticism from the left-wing readers of the newspaper, who thought the Moomins were too bourgeois, and the newspaper did not order any more comic strips from Jansson. After Sutton's offer, Jansson made a seven-year contract to draw Moomin comic strips in June 1952. Before the comic was published, Jansson developed the strip together with the comic press of Associated Newspapers, and particularly Charles Sutton guided the artist in great detail. For a time, the syndicate sought a separate writer for the strip, but in the end, the decision was that Jansson would both write and draw the strip herself.

The newspaper that would publish the Moomin comic strip ended up being Evening News, part of the Associated Newspapers syndicate, which was the largest afternoon newspaper at the time, with a circulation of 12 million. The comic strip Moomin was first published in the newspaper on 20 September 1954. Sutton had organised a very prominent advertisement campaign to support the start of the new comic strip. The strip was quickly sold to other countries, particularly the Nordic countries. In Finland, the strip started on 21 April 1955 in Ilta-Sanomat, the largest afternoon newspaper in the country. In the same year, the strip also started in the Swedish-language local newspapers Västra Nyland and Vasabladet, and in 1957 in Åbo Underrättelser. Most newspapers publishing the Moomin comic strip were European, but it was also published in more distant places. In North America, it was finally sold to the Canadian Toronto Daily Star, but in the United States, no newspaper worthy of note accepted it on its pages.

List of comic strip stories
The strip was divided into episodes, each with distinct titles and storylines.

Republication
The comic strips are currently being republished in a set of hardback books, in original publication order, by Canadian publisher Drawn & Quarterly. The first five volumes collect the Tove and Tove/Lars strips, and are titled Moomin: The Complete Tove Jansson Comic Strip. The sixth and subsequent volumes collects Lars' strips, and are titled  Moomin: The Complete Lars Jansson Comic Strip.

Adaptations
The Moomin (1990) anime series featured several episodes, which are loose adaptations based on comic strip stories, while several characters from comic strips are featured in the anime series as well. The second season, known as sequel anime series  in Japan, has also several episodes based on the comic strip stories more rather than original novels made by Tove Jansson. Notably, few episodes featured time traveling with the time machine, that has accidentally created by Moominpapa. Both of seasons' episodes are directed by Hiroshi Saitô and Masayuki Kojima.

Animated film

The 2014 traditional animated comedy film directed by Xavier Picard and produced by Hanna Hemilä, is based on the Moomin on the Riviera comic strip story and has been first released on 10 October 2014 in Finland to celebrate the 100th anniversary of Tove Jansson's birth. The film is heavily faithful to the original comic strip story, while it features some elements from other comic strip stories and adds several characters who didn't appear in the original story to the film such as Little My and Snufkin.

References

Finnish comic strips
1947 comics debuts
Comics characters introduced in 1947
Fictional Finnish people
Moomins
Fantasy comics
Humor comics
Satirical comics